Offspring is a 2009 horror film directed by Andrew van den Houten. The film centers on survivors of a feral flesh-eating tribe who abduct locals. It is based on the novel of the same name by Jack Ketchum, which is itself the sequel to Off Season. The cannibals in this film speak a language of grunts which is subtitled for the viewer. This did not happen in the sequel, as it only contains one of them.

Plot

Cast

Sequels
Pollyanna McIntosh reprises her role in the sequel, The Woman. Before he began to direct the film, a friend of van den Houten's specifically requested that he keep The Woman alive so she could appear in a sequel.

In 2019, McIntosh wrote and directed a standalone sequel to The Woman titled Darlin'.

References

External links
Offspring at IMDb

2009 films
2009 horror films
Films about cannibalism
2000s English-language films